Francisco Todesco (born 31 October 1937) is a Brazilian rower. He competed in the men's coxed four event at the 1960 Summer Olympics.

References

1937 births
Living people
Brazilian male rowers
Olympic rowers of Brazil
Rowers at the 1960 Summer Olympics
Pan American Games medalists in rowing
Pan American Games bronze medalists for Brazil
Rowers at the 1963 Pan American Games